Derek Smart is a former professional rugby league footballer who played in the 1950s and 1960s.

Playing career

Club career
Derek Smart made his début for Wakefield Trinity during January 1960, and he played his last match for Wakefield Trinity during the 1959–60 season.

References

External links
Search for "Smart" at rugbyleagueproject.org
Derek Smart Memory Box Search at archive.castigersheritage.com

Living people
Castleford Tigers players
English rugby league players
Place of birth missing (living people)
Rugby league wingers
Wakefield Trinity players
Year of birth missing (living people)